Global Radio owns and operates a number of radio stations in the United Kingdom:

References

External links

Capital
Capital Xtra
Gold
Heart
LBC
Global Radio

List of Global Group stations